National Route 437 is a national highway of Japan connecting Matsuyama, Ehime and Iwakuni, Yamaguchi in Japan, with a total length of 61.7 km (38.34 mi).

References

437
Roads in Ehime Prefecture
Roads in Yamaguchi Prefecture